DC Nation Shorts are animated shorts featuring characters from DC Comics that aired in a series on Cartoon Network on Saturdays at 10/9c.

Production
On March 3, 2012, the shorts premiered as part of the DC Nation block, produced by Warner Bros. Animation. They are aired alongside Green Lantern: The Animated Series and Young Justice, as well as with Beware the Batman and Teen Titans Go! in 2013. On June 8, 2012, Cartoon Network announced that it would revive the Teen Titans animated series as Teen Titans Go!, based on the New Teen Titans shorts. Despite having one Cartoon Network / Warner Bros. Animation short, Swaroop (aired during The Big Pick contest), DC Nation Shorts was the first and only Cartoon Network original series co-produced by DC Entertainment and Warner Bros. Animation.

In 2011, Sam Register promised new content every week on the block in addition to the shorts: "...whether that's a new show or an interstitial or a short".

Series

Episodes

DC Nation Super Spectacular
In May 2012, DC Comics released a 64-page monthly magazine called DC Nation Super Spectacular. The featured strips are based on the Young Justice & Green Lantern: The Animated Series television series as well as additional content such as behind the scenes features.

Latin America
The DC Nation Shorts have been transmitted by Cartoon Network (Latin America) since July 2013. The series are transmitted randomly in commercial breaks and it has broadcast shorts this way for years. This is because Cartoon Network Latin has not incorporated the DC Nation block. The shorts broadcast were Tokyo/Baby Superman, DC Super Pets, Animal Man, Vibe, and The New Teen Titans.

References

External links

 
 
 
 
 
 
 
 
 
 
 
 
 
 
 
 
 
 
 
 
 
 
 
 

DC Nation
2010s American animated television series
2010s American anthology television series
2011 American television series debuts
2014 American television series endings
American children's animated action television series
American children's animated anthology television series
American children's animated comedy television series
American children's animated superhero television series
American flash animated television series
English-language television shows
Cartoon Network original programming
Teen Titans in other media
Animated short films based on DC Comics
Television series by Aardman Animations
Television series by Warner Bros. Animation